Arrowhead Provincial Park is located north of Huntsville, Ontario, Canada, and is part of the Ontario Parks system.  A portion of the shoreline of Glacial Lake Algonquin is visible in the park.

During the winter, a  man-made skating trail winds through the forest.  Other winter activities at the park include cross-country skiing, snowshoeing and tubing.

References

External links

Provincial parks of Ontario
Parks in the District Municipality of Muskoka
Protected areas established in 1971
1971 establishments in Ontario